Jean-Baptiste-Pierre Le Brun (1748 – 7 August 1813) was a French painter, art collector and art dealer. Simon Denis was his pupil.

Life 
Born in Paris, he was the son of the painter Pierre Le Brun, who was himself a great-nephew of another painter, Charles Le Brun. From 1775 onwards he became one of the main art dealers and painting experts in Paris, specialising in restoring old masters, particularly Dutch ones, and publishing catalogues of them for commercial purposes. His own collection included Ochtervelt 's Street Musicians at the Door and later an Immaculate Conception by Murillo.

His first marriage was in the Netherlands, before a second marriage on 11 January 1776 at Saint-Eustache, Paris to Élisabeth Louise Vigée. He had first met her the previous year, becoming her agent and eventually proposing marriage – the marriage was discouraged due to his reputation as a rake and a gambler but she accepted nonetheless. They had one child, Jeanne Julie Louise Lebrun, who in 1800 married Gaëtan Bertrand Nigris, director of the Imperial Theatre in St. Petersburg.

In 1778 he bought the former Palais Lubert on rue de Cléry in París. Ten years later he opened the "Salle Lebrun", a neoclassically-decorated gallery and saleroom for antiquities and paintings by Greuze, Fragonard and other artists, including Watteau's The Worried Lover and The Chord. The gallery invented "a new architecture, that of an auction room with overhead lighting". His wife sold her portraits there for 12,000 francs, but received only 6 francs, with her husband pocketing the rest – as she wrote in her Souvenirs "He was so unconcerned about money that he hardly knew its value". In 1781 he and his wife travelled to Brussels to buy works at the sale of the fallen governor Prince Charles Alexander of Lorraine.

The early years of the French Revolution saw the collapse of the art market, forcing Lebrun to sell his own collection in 1791. He became a supporter of the Revolution, though his wife remained a monarchist and left France in autumn 1789. The new government called on him to appraise and catalogue the artworks it had seized from churches and from emigres. Wishing to take part in setting up a national museum in the Louvre Palace, he retired from the museum commission and entered discussions with the Minister of the Interior Jean-Marie Roland de la Platière.

On la Platière's resignation on 23 January 1793 and the Girondists' departure, Robespierre took power and was also favourable to the idea. The following month, Lebrun bought several paintings for the Louvre with Jacques-Louis David's support but without the government's knowledge, including a Holy Family attributed to Rembrandt and Peter Paul Rubens' Portrait of Suzanne Fourment. His purchases totalled 30,000 livres at a time when the First Republic was in a budgetary crisis and so an annual acquisitions budget was set for the Louvre to avoid a repeat of the situation. He was one of the businessmen who worked with the count of Angivillier to augment the royal collections which served as the nucleus for the new Louvre Museum. As a painter he also restored paintings for the Louvre.

In 1793 he made a failed attempt to have his wife removed from the list of emigres, something which only eventually occurred in 1800. Publishing a pamphlet entitled Précis Historique de la Citoyenne Lebrun. He and his brother-in-law Étienne Vigée were both imprisoned for some months. Citing his wife's desertion, Jean-Baptiste-Pierre was divorced from her in 1794 to protect and preserve his own assets.

He became indispensable to the running of the new Louvre and continued producing catalogues of emigres' collections, distinguishing between works that should end up in national collections and works that could be sold off to produce income for the state. He published Observations sur le Museum national: pour servir de suite aux réflexions qu'il a déjà publiées sur le même objet in 1793, laying the foundations for the future organisation and collections of the Louvre Museum.

In 1795 he was made the museum's expert curator, organising the galleries into Italian, French and North European works. As an assistant to the arts commission, he also published Essai sur les moyens d'encourager la peinture, la sculpture, l'architecture et la gravure ... in 1794–1795, but Napoleon's rise to power led to Lebrun's departure from the National Museum. He failed to return to the Parisian art market, pushing him into debt, and on 14 January 1807 he was forced to sell the Salle Lebrun and the mansion to his wife, an excellent business-woman. He died in Paris.

Works

References

Bibliography 
  Gilberte, Émile-Mâle (1956). «Jean-Baptiste-Pierre Lebrun (1748–1813). Son rôle dans l’histoire de la restauration des tableaux du Louvre». Mémoires de la Fédération des sociétés historiques et archéologiques de Paris et de l’Île-de-France VIII: 371–417.
 Edwards, Lynn (1998). «Le Brun, Jean-Baptiste-Pierre», Grove Art Online (Oxford University Press). ISBN 978-1-884446-05-4.

External links 
  Elec – École des chartes – Thèses : Cécilie Champy, “Curieux idolâtres et acheteurs de statues”. Le marché de la sculpture sous la Révolution et l’Empire à Paris
  Ministère de la Culture : Lebrun, Jean-Baptiste Pierre
  INHA : Les catalogues de vente de Jean-Baptiste-Pierre Le Brun

1748 births
1813 deaths
Le Brun family
People from Paris
French portrait painters
18th-century French painters
French art dealers
French art historians
Conservator-restorers
Vigée family

Date of birth missing